Gymnoscelis holocapna is a moth in the family Geometridae. It is found in Australia (the Northern Territory).

References

Moths described in 1922
Gymnoscelis